Davydovo is a rural locality (a village) in Domshinskoye Rural Settlement, Sheksninsky District, Vologda Oblast, Russia. The population was 9 as of 2002.

Geography 
Davydovo is located 39 km southeast of Sheksna (the district's administrative centre) by road. Boyarovo is the nearest rural locality.

References 

Rural localities in Sheksninsky District